Sir John Donald Garner (1931-2019) was a British diplomat. He was Ambassador to Afghanistan from 1981 to 1984, although his term was disrupted by the Soviet-Afghan War. He was High Commissioner to the Gambia from 1984 to 1987.

References

Ambassadors of the United Kingdom to Afghanistan
Ambassadors and High Commissioners of the United Kingdom to the Gambia
1931 births
2019 deaths